The NS 7100 was a series of tank engines of the Dutch Railways (NS) and its predecessors Maatschappij tot Exploitatie van Staatsspoorwegen (SS), Hollandsche IJzeren Spoorweg-Maatschappij (HSM) and Noord-Friesche Locaalspoorweg-Maatschappij (NFLS).

Series NFLS 1-10 / HSM 1051-1061 / NS 7101-7110 
At the beginning of the twentieth century, the NFLS ordered ten locomotives for local trains on the Leeuwarden - Stiens - Metslawier, Stiens - Harlingen, and Tzummarum - Franeker Halte lines from the Hohenzollern factory in Düsseldorf-Grafenberg. They were tank engines with the 1'B1' wheel arrangement, the leading axle of which was designed as an Adams axle. The first six locomotives entered service in 1901, followed by the other four in 1902. As of December 1 1905, the operation of these lines was taken over by the HSM, whereby the locomotives and rolling stock was also taken over. The HSM renumbered the ten locomotives in the series 1051-1060. 

When the locomotives and rolling stock fleet of the HSM and the SS was merged in 1921, the locomotives of this series were given the NS numbers 7101-7110. No. 7110 was withdrawn from service in 1925, followed by No. 7107 in 1939. At the end of World War II, Nos. 7104, 7105 and 7108 were taken to Germany, of which only No. 7108 was returned to service. Of the locomotives that remained in the Netherlands, Nos. 7102 and 7109 were not repaired from war damage. The locomotives that did return to service after the war were withdrawn in 1949.

Series SS 531-545 / NS 7111-7125 
A few years after the delivery of the first batch of ten tank locomotives, the SS ordered about fifteen similar locomotives from the same factory. The first seven were put into service in 1907 as SS 531-537. The SS 538-545 followed in 1908. The SS used these locomotives on light passenger trains on local railway lines. When the locomotives and rolling stock fleet of the HSM and the SS was merged in 1921, these locomotives were given the NS numbers 7111-7125 after the original ten HSM locomotives. No. 7114 was withdrawn from service in 1925, followed by No. 7116 in 1936. 

During the German invasion, No. 7124 was run into the Potmarge near Leeuwarden to stop the advance of the enemy troops. After the locomotive was salvaged, it was not repaired. At the end of the war, Nos. 7117, 7118, 7120, 7122 and 7123 were taken to Germany. The first four returned damaged after the war, but were never repaired. No. 7123 did not return at all and was scrapped at Hagenow in 1951. Of the locomotives left behind in the Netherlands, Nos. 7113 and 7119 were not repaired from war damage. The remaining locomotives were withdrawn from service in 1947 and 1948.

Gallery

Sources 
 H. Waldorp: Onze Nederlandse stoomlocomotieven in woord en beeld. Uitg. De Alk, Alkmaar, 1981. .
 J.J. Karskens: De Locomotieven van de Hollandsche IJzeren Spoorweg Maatschappij. Uitg. J.H. Gottmer, Haarlem - Antwerpen, 1947.
 R.C. Statius Muller, A.J. Veenendaal jr., H. Waldorp: De Nederlandse stoomlocomotieven. Uitg. De Alk, Alkmaar, 2005. 
 Jacq. van der Meer: De Hollandsche IJzeren Spoorweg-Maatschappij. Uitg. Uquilair, Rosmalen, 2009. .

Rolling stock of the Netherlands
Steam locomotives of the Netherlands
Hohenzollern locomotives
Hollandsche IJzeren Spoorweg-Maatschappij
Maatschappij tot Exploitatie van Staatsspoorwegen
NFLS